First Ministry of Machine Industry of the PRC (中华人民共和国第一机械工业部) was one of the central offices in the People's Republic of China.

The Ministry was established in August 1952. It continued to operate during and after the Cultural Revolution. In May 1982, its name was changed to the Ministry of Machine-Building of the PRC. In December 1985, the ministry was liquidated upon the creation of the State Machine-Building Commission.

See also
Second Ministry of Machine-Building of the PRC, ministry of nuclear industry
Third Ministry of Machine-Building of the PRC, ministry of aviation industry
Fourth Ministry of Machine-Building of the PRC, ministry of electronics industry
Fifth Ministry of Machine-Building of the PRC, ministry of tank equipment and artillery
Sixth Ministry of Machine-Building of the PRC, ministry of shipbuilding
Seventh Ministry of Machine-Building of the PRC, ministry of space industry
Eighth Ministry of Machine-Building of the PRC

Bibliography
 Malcolm Lamb: Directory of officials and Organizations in China, ME Sharpe Inc. Armonk, NY, 2003, p. 1911 +, Volume 1
 China's Economic System, Routledge Abingdon 2005, 594 p., 

Government ministries of the People's Republic of China